Tomasz Mikołajczak (born 11 December 1987) is a Polish professional footballer who plays as a striker for Chojniczanka Chojnice.

Career
He joined this club in the summer 2009 from Nielba Wągrowiec. Mikołajczak is a trainee of Obra Kościan.

External links
 
 

1987 births
Living people
Polish footballers
Obra Kościan players
Nielba Wągrowiec players
Lech Poznań players
Polonia Bytom players
Chojniczanka Chojnice players
Ekstraklasa players
I liga players
II liga players
People from Kościan
Sportspeople from Greater Poland Voivodeship
Association football forwards